The Fokker V.6 was a prototype fighter triplane developed in Germany during World War I in parallel with the V.5, from which the famous Dr.I was developed. The V.6 was powered by an 89 kW (120 hp) Mercedes D.II liquid-cooled engine. The heavier engine required larger wings, with the lower wing being placed just below the fuselage. A modification to add fairings to the lower wing fuselage junction was implemented after the first tests. The V.6 was abandoned in October 1917 due to being inferior in maneuverability to the newer Dr.I.

Specifications (Fokker V.6)

References

Bibliography

1910s German fighter aircraft
V.06
Single-engined tractor aircraft
Triplanes
Aircraft first flown in 1917